Hadley may refer to:

Places

Canada 
 Hadley Bay, on the north of Victoria Island, Nunavut

England 
 Hadley, London, a former civil parish within Barnet Urban District from 1894 to 1965
 Hadley, Shropshire, part of the new town of Telford, Shropshire
 Hadley Wood in the London Borough of Enfield
 Monken Hadley, suburb of Barnet, in the London Borough of Barnet

United States 
 Hadley Township, Pike County, Illinois
 Hadley, Indiana
 Hadley, Kentucky
 Hadley, Massachusetts
 South Hadley, Massachusetts
 Hadley Township, Michigan
 Hadley, Minnesota
 Hadley, Missouri
 Hadley, Nevada
 Hadley's Purchase, New Hampshire, an uninhabited township of Coos County
 Hadley, New York, town in Saratoga County
 Hadley (CDP), New York, the main hamlet in the town
 Hadley, Pennsylvania, a place in Mercer County
 Branchland, West Virginia, an unincorporated community in West Virginia also known as Hadley

Other
 Hadley (crater), a crater on Mars
 Hadley (name), an English name, most commonly a surname
 Hadley (non-profit organization) for visually impaired adults in Winnetka, Illinois
 Hadley!, a 2010 Australian TV talk show hosted by Ray Hadley
 Hadley cell, a tropical atmospheric circulation
 Hadley Centre for Climate Prediction and Research in Exeter, England
 Hadley F.C., an association football club from Barnet, England
 Hadley Junior High School, in Glen Ellyn, Illinois
 Hadley Pottery, an American pottery and stoneware company
 Hadley–Apennine, a region on the Moon and landing site for NASA's Apollo 15 mission

See also
 Hadley House (disambiguation)
 Hadley Township (disambiguation)
 Hadleigh (disambiguation)